Je ne mâche pas les mots is the second studio album by French singer and television celebrity Elisa Tovati. It was released on 15 May 2006 in France as a digital download. It peaked at number 53 on the French Albums Chart.

Singles
 "Débile menthol" was the first single released from the album on 26 April 2006.

Track listing

Chart performance

Release history

References

2006 albums
Elisa Tovati albums